The New Zealand cricket team toured India in September and October 2016 to play three Test matches and five One Day Internationals (ODIs). India won the Test series 3–0 and the ODI series 3–2.

In April 2016, the Board of Control for Cricket in India (BCCI) announced the proposition of one of the Test matches being a day/night game. New Zealand Cricket stated that "a number of factors were yet to be finalised before the match could be confirmed". In June 2016, the BCCI confirmed the fixtures for India's 2016/17 season, but there was no mention of a day/night Test. However, it was reported that a senior official of the Cricket Association of Bengal had confirmed that the Test match in Kolkata would be a day/night game. At the end of June the dates and times of the matches were announced, with the BCCI stating that all the Tests will start at 9:30am local time. In September 2016, the BCCI confirmed that there would be no day/night Tests in India during the 2016–17 season.

In September 2016 the BCCI moved the second ODI from 19 October to 20 October because of Karva Chauth. The first Test in Kanpur was India's 500th Test match and the second Test in Kolkata was India's 250th Test match at home. The first ODI in Dharamshala was India's 900th ODI match.

Following the conclusion of the second Test, there were reports that the Lodha Committee had frozen the BCCI's bank accounts. The BCCI then threatened to cancel all the remaining fixtures of the tour. The chief executive of New Zealand Cricket, David White, said that their team would continue with the tour and were preparing to travel to Indore for the third Test. However, the Lodha Committee clarified what it had said, saying they did not ask for the BCCI's accounts to be frozen, but requested that two specific payments were stopped.

Squads

Tim Southee was ruled out of New Zealand's Test squad due to injury and was replaced by Matt Henry. Mark Craig suffered an injury in the first Test and was ruled out of the rest of the series. He was replaced by Jeetan Patel. After the end of the first Test, KL Rahul was replaced by Gautam Gambhir due to injury and Ishant Sharma was replaced by Jayant Yadav due to illness. Shikhar Dhawan was ruled out of the third Test with a fractured finger and replaced by Karun Nair. Bhuvneshwar Kumar was ruled out of the third Test with a back injury and was replaced by Shardul Thakur. Suresh Raina was not included in the squad for final two ODIs because he was yet to regain full fitness after an illness.

Tour match

Three-day: Mumbai vs New Zealanders

Test series

1st Test

2nd Test

3rd Test

ODI series

1st ODI

2nd ODI

3rd ODI

4th ODI

5th ODI

References

External links
 Series home at ESPN Cricinfo

2016 in New Zealand cricket
2016 in Indian cricket
International cricket competitions in 2016–17
New Zealand cricket tours of India